Logtun is a village in the municipality of Frosta in Trøndelag county, Norway. Logtun is the location of the historic Logtun Church, near the site of the old Frostating assembly.9

References

Villages in Trøndelag
Frosta